WNHN-LP (94.7 FM) is a low-power radio station broadcasting a talk and music format. Licensed to Concord, New Hampshire, US, the station is owned by New Hampshire's News, Views & Blues.

In August 2000, Highland Community Broadcasting applied for a low-power FM license. In July 2003 the FCC granted a license to Highland, for 94.7 in Concord. After 6 months of raising funds, WCNH-LP was constructed and went on the air at 2 p.m. on February 29, 2004. WCNH-LP aired a classical music format. In October 2008 Highland was granted a construction permit for a new non-commercial license for 91.5 MHz in Bow, New Hampshire. In October 2011 that new frequency was launched as WCNH. Concurrent with the move, New Hampshire's News, Views & Blues purchased the former WCNH-LP from Highland Community Broadcasting.

See also
List of community radio stations in the United States

References

External links
 WNHN-LP official website
 

Community radio stations in the United States
NHN-LP
NHN-LP
Concord, New Hampshire
Radio stations established in 2004
2004 establishments in New Hampshire